Noi uomini duri (i.e. "We tough men") is a 1987 Italian comedy film directed by Maurizio Ponzi.

Plot  
Mario (Enrico Montesano), a tram-driver, and Silvio (Renato Pozzetto), a banker, make friends in the group of participants in a survival training course. Among evidence of daring, unusual gimmicks to learn and little food, it's a terrible life. But at least there is, for Silvio, the spasm to Cora, the wife of a sort of Rambo, who wins all the various tests of the course.

Cast 
 Enrico Montesano: Mario Fortini
 Renato Pozzetto: Silvio
 Isabel Russinova: Cora
 Alessandra Mussolini: Adua
 Novello Novelli: Berno Berni, Sr.
 Mariangela Giordano: Teresa
 Maria-Pia Casilio: Ines

See also       
 List of Italian films of 1987

References

External links

1987 films
1980s Italian-language films
Films directed by Maurizio Ponzi
Italian buddy comedy films
1980s buddy comedy films
1987 comedy films
1980s Italian films